Charilaos Mitrelias (died 16 May 1988 in Athens) was a Greek jurist and politician. He began a long career at the Council of State in 1929, culminating in his service as its president from 1961 until his retirement in 1966. He then served as Deputy Prime Minister in the government of Spyros Markezinis, a failed attempt to enact a transition to democracy during the Greek military junta of 1967–74.

References

Year of birth uncertain
1988 deaths
Deputy Prime Ministers of Greece
Leaders of the Greek junta
People from Lesbos
Presidents of the Council of State (Greece)
20th-century Greek judges